Lønsdal is a village in the municipality of Saltdal in Nordland county, Norway.  The village is located in the Lønsdal valley, along the Lønselva river. European route E06 highway and the Nordland Line both pass through the village.  The village also has a train station on the Nordland Line, about halfway between Dunderland Station and Røkland Station.

The village lies just east of the lake Kjemåvatnet and the mountain Ørfjellet.  Due to its proximity to Junkerdal National Park and Saltfjellet–Svartisen National Park, it is mostly a tourist village.  There is a hotel and it is a starting point for many hiking tours.

References

External links
List of stations on the Nordland Line (Jernbaneverket)

Saltdal
Villages in Nordland
Populated places of Arctic Norway